Ju, also spelled Joo or Chu, is a Korean family name and an element in Korean given names. Its meaning differs based on the hanja used to write it.

Family name
As a family name, Ju may be written with either of two hanja, one meaning "red" (붉을 주), and the other meaning "around" (두루 주). The former has one bon-gwan (Wu Yuan, China), while the latter has four (Sangju, Gyeongsangbuk-do; Chogye-myeon, Hapcheon-gun, Gyeongsangnam-do; Cheorwon-gun, Gangwonnam-do; and Anui-myeon, Hamyang-gun, Gyeongsangnam-do).  The 2000 South Korean census found 215,010 people with this family name.

In a study by the National Institute of the Korean Language based on 2007 application data for South Korean passports, it was found that 50.6% of people with this surname spelled it in Latin letters as Ju in their passports, and another 46.9% spelled it as Joo. Rarer alternative spellings (the remaining 2.4%) included Chu and Choo.

People with these family names include:

Ju Si-gyeong (1876–1914), Joseon Dynasty linguist
Chu Yo-han (1900–1976), South Korean poet
Chu Yung-kwang (1920–1982), South Korean footballer
Chu Sang-song (born 1933), North Korean politician, former Minister of People's Security
Ju Kyu-chang (born 1939), North Korean industrial official
Joo Hyun (born Joo Il-choo, 1941), South Korean actor
Joo Hyun-mi (born 1961), South Korean trot singer
Ju Jong-gwan (born 1971), South Korean sprint canoer
Joo Jin-mo (born 1958), South Korean actor
Joo Jin-mo (born 1974), South Korean actor
Ju Seung-jin (born 1975), South Korean footballer
Joo Hee-jung (born 1977), South Korean basketball player
Joo Sang-wook (born 1978), South Korean actor
Joo Se-hyuk (born 1980), South Korean table tennis player
Brian Joo (born 1981), American-born South Korean singer
Ju Ho-jin (born 1981), South Korean footballer
Joo Ki-hwan (born 1981), South Korean footballer
Joo Hyun-jung (born 1982), South Korean archer
Ju Ji-hoon (born 1982), South Korean actor
Joo Jong-hyuk (born 1983), South Korean actor and singer
Joo Jong-hyuk (born 1991), South Korean actor
Joo Min-jin (born 1983), South Korean short track speed skater
Joo Jae-duk (born 1985), South Korean footballer
Ju Kwang-youn (born 1985), South Korean footballer
Joo Hyeon-woo (born 1990), South Korean footballer
Ju Kwang-min (born 1990), North Korean footballer
Joo Hyong-jun (born 1991), South Korean speed skater
Dong Moon Joo, Korean-American businessman
Joo Hee-sun, South Korean music video director
Joo Seong-ha, North Korean journalist who defected to South Korea in 2002
Hyung-ki Joo, British classical pianist of Korean descent
Judy Joo, Korean-American celebrity chef

Given name
There are 56 hanja with the reading "ju" on the South Korean government's official list of hanja which may be used in given names; they are listed in the table at right. One name containing this syllable, Eun-ju, was the sixth-most popular name for newborn South Korean girls in 1970.

Names beginning with this syllable include:
Joo-hwan (masculine)
Joo-hyun (unisex)
Joo-won (unisex)

Names ending with this syllable include:

Dong-joo (masculine)
Eun-ju (feminine)
Hae-joo (unisex)
Hong-joo (unisex)
Hyo-joo (feminine)
Hyun-joo (unisex)
Hyung-joo (unisex)
Jin-joo (unisex)
Min-ju (unisex)
Kyung-ju (unisex)
Seok-ju (masculine)
Young-joo (unisex)

People with the single syllable given name Ju include:
Joo (singer), stage name of Jung Min-joo (born 1990), South Korean solo singer, and older sister of Jung Il-hoon (former member of South Korean  boy band BtoB)

See also
List of Korean family names
List of Korean given names

References

Korean-language surnames
Korean given names